Emily Chantiri is an Australian freelance journalist, author and finance writer.

Chantiri has written about personal finance for over a decade and achieved success as a co-author of the best-selling book The Money Club. She has two other books that have appeared on the best-sellers list in Australia. She currently writes for The Sydney Morning Herald newspaper and also writes a number of columns for other various Australian publications. She also specializes in travel, management and property.

Chantiri recently published a book, The Voice of Intuition.

Bibliography
 The Savvy Girl's Money Book : the Savvy Way to Have the Life You Want; Millers Point: Murdoch Books, 2005 (rev. 2nd ed., 2012)
 Every Day is Mother's Day : find time, save money & reward yourself, without the guilt; Milton, Qld. : John Wiley and Sons Australia, 2008
 The Money Club (with Frances Beck, Dianne Hill and Di Robinson); Milsons Point: Random House, 2001 (rev. 2nd ed., 2010)

References

External links
 http://www.emilychantiri.com

Living people
Year of birth missing (living people)
Place of birth missing (living people)
Australian women journalists
Australian freelance journalists